Statistics of Úrvalsdeild in the 2003 season.

Overview
It was contested by 10 teams, and KR won the championship. Þróttur's Björgólfur Takefusa was the top scorer with 10 goals.

League standings

Results
Each team played every opponent once home and away for a total of 18 matches.

References

Úrvalsdeild karla (football) seasons
1
Iceland
Iceland